Ulrich Nitzschke (25 July 1933 – 23 July 2013) was a German boxer. He competed in the men's heavyweight event at the 1956 Summer Olympics.

References

External links
 

1933 births
2013 deaths
German male boxers
Olympic boxers of the United Team of Germany
Boxers at the 1956 Summer Olympics
People from Quedlinburg
Heavyweight boxers
Sportspeople from Saxony-Anhalt